Tomas Gustafson is a Swedish speed skater.

Tomas Gustafson may also refer to:

 Tomas Antonelius, or Tomas Gustafsson, Swedish footballer
 Thomas G:son, Swedish composer and musician